The fastest times in the swimming events at the South American Games are designated as the South American Games records in swimming and maintained by the South American Swimming Confederation (CONSANAT).

The most recent edition of these games were the aquatics competitions at the 2014 South American Games in March 2014.

Participating countries
CONSANAT member countries participate in these Championships:

Games records
All records were set in finals unless noted otherwise. All times are swum in a long-course (50m) pool.

Men

Women

Mixed relay

References

Swimming competitions in South America
South American Games
Swimming